The Women's Softball European Championship is the main championship tournament between national women's softball teams in Europe, governed by the European Softball Federation (ESF).

Beginning with 2020, the European championship will be held in even years and serve as qualifiers for softball World Cups.

Results

Medal table

See also
European Baseball Championship

References

External links
European Softball Federation

 *
Recurring sporting events established in 1979
 
1979 establishments in Europe